Arena Po (Lombard: Reina) is a comune (municipality) in the Province of Pavia in the Italian region Lombardy, located about 45 km southeast of Milan and about 20 km southeast of Pavia. As of 31 December 2004, it had a population of 1,595 and an area of 22.3 km².

Arena Po borders the following municipalities: Bosnasco, Castel San Giovanni, Pieve Porto Morone, Portalbera, San Zenone al Po, Spessa, Stradella, Zenevredo, and Zerbo.  Composer Giovanni Quirici was born in the comune.

Demographic evolution

References 

Cities and towns in Lombardy
Articles which contain graphical timelines